Colney Heath Mill is a Grade II listed smock mill at Colney Heath, Hertfordshire, England which has been converted to residential accommodation.

History

Colney Heath Mill was built in the 1850s. It was working until 1906, latterly by steam engine. The mill was converted to residential accommodation between 1999 and 2004

Description

Colney Heath Mill is a four-storey tower mill It has a domed cap. There were four sails which drove three pairs of millstones.

Millers

Edward Whitehead 1854–62
Samuel Fairey 1862–75
James Fairey 1867–75
Henry James 1875–1900
William James 1900–06
Reference for above:-

References

External links
Windmill World webpage on Colney Heath Mill.

Towers completed in 1854
Windmills completed in 1854
Industrial buildings completed in 1854
Windmills in Hertfordshire
Tower mills in the United Kingdom
Grinding mills in the United Kingdom
Grade II listed buildings in Hertfordshire
Grade II listed windmills
1854 establishments in England